is an action-adventure stealth video game series, originally developed by Japanese developer Acquire, where the player assumes the role of a ninja in 16th-century Japan. The title in Japanese literally translates in English as "Divine Retribution", with 天 (ten) meaning heaven and 誅 (chū) meaning death penalty (another translation of this phrase, Wrath of Heaven, is the title of the first PlayStation 2 entry in the series).

Plot
The series takes place in 16th-century feudal Japan. The original story (Stealth Assassins) revolves around two ninjas, Rikimaru and Ayame, who have both been members of the Azuma Ninja Clan since childhood. The two ninjas serve the benevolent Lord Gohda and work for him as his secret spies to root out corruption and gather intelligence in his province. However, the evil demonic sorcerer Lord Mei-Oh sought to destroy Lord Gohda, and using his demon warrior Onikage, wreaked havoc throughout Lord Gohda's province. Although Lord Mei-Oh was killed in the first game, Onikage appeared in all subsequent games (except Fatal Shadows and Tenchu Z) as the archenemy of the two ninja, especially Rikimaru. Another major character who shows up frequently is Princess Kiku, Lord Gohda's daughter who often needs to be saved.

Gameplay
The game perspective is third-person. There are numerous items to help the ninja on his/her mission, but unlockable items can be acquired if the player gets a "Grand Master" rating at the end of the level by being as stealthy as possible. Items and controls vary from game to game, but the gameplay is essentially the same throughout except Tenchu: Shadow Assassins. Stealth is a very important element in the game, where players have to duck, crouch, and hide behind walls to avoid detection.  Enemies can be killed with one maneuver by using Stealth Kills, and a player can avoid detection by using the Ki meter. The larger the number, the closer the player's position to an enemy. If a player is spotted, the Ki meter will turn red, the enemy will alert everyone in the area, and the player is forced to fight hand-to-hand or hide somewhere until the enemies give up their search and resume their patrol routes.

Characters

The main characters of the Tenchu series are Rikimaru, Ayame, Tesshu and Rin. Rikimaru is a tall, white-haired shinobi with a single ninjatō named "Izayoi" and a scar over his right eye. He is physically stronger than Ayame and Rin, but relatively slower. Ayame is a kunoichi (female ninja) who wears standard ninja clothes with her midriff exposed and carries a pair of kodachi. She is faster and can perform more combos than Rikimaru and Tesshu, but is weaker than them. Tesshu is a vigilante who wears blue doctor's clothes and fights bare-handed with acupuncture needles; he is strong like Rikimaru, but slower than Ayame and Rin. His appearance is heavily based on the character "Baian Fujieda". Rin is a young kunoichi who carries a large katana called Natsume. Despite wielding a sword, she prefers to use hand-to-hand combat, relying on fast combos like Ayame.

Games

Activision purchased the rights to this game from Sony Music Entertainment, who originally published the game in Japan. However, Activision sold the rights to the Japanese game publisher FromSoftware in 2004. FromSoftware's rights agreement does not include games previously published by Activision. FromSoftware licensed distribution of Fatal Shadows to Sega.

There is an additional Japan-exclusive release for Tenchu on the PlayStation. One hundred of the best competing levels designed with the level editor of Tenchu: Shinobi Gaisen (an expanded version of Tenchu re-released in Japan) were put together to form a stand-alone, non-story based expansion set called Tenchu: Shinobi Hyakusen. The engine and game fundamentals remained unchanged. Shinobi Hyakusen is famous for the hardest level settings among Tenchu fans, especially because of the tight time limits and the overall lack of the items, excluding the caltrops and the throwing stars. No North American or European versions were released however.

Several games were also ported to mobile phones with graphic changes. These include Tenchu: Ayame's Tale 3D which was released for the Sony Ericsson mobile phone series and Tenchu: Wrath of Heaven by TKO-Software and Digital Bridges which was released for mobile phones in 2005, although it used two-dimensional graphics. A stage play adaptation Tenchu Butai was performed in 2014.

It's estimated that the whole series sales are at 10 million games sold worldwide as of 2018.

See also
List of ninja video games
Shinobido: Way of the Ninja – a 2006 PS2 game with similar gameplay and stealth/action principals, also developed by Acquire.
Sekiro: Shadows Die Twice – a 2019 title developed by FromSoftware and published by Activision which was initially conceived as a new Tenchu game.

References

External links
 

 
Activision Blizzard franchises
Kadokawa Dwango franchises
Video game franchises
Video games set in feudal Japan
Sengoku period in fiction
Sengoku video games
Video game franchises introduced in 1998